Shend Kelmendi (born 21 September 1994) is a Kosovar professional footballer who plays as a forward for KF Flamurtari.

Club career

Prishtina
On 13 September 2013. Kelmendi made his debut with Prishtina in a Football Superleague of Kosovo match against Gjilani after coming on as a substitute at 29th minute in place of Liridon Latifi.

Trepça'89
On 22 July 2017. Kelmendi signed to Football Superleague of Kosovo side Trepça'89.

Skënderbeu Korçë
On 10 August 2017. Kelmendi completed a transfer to Skënderbeu Korçë by signing for the next three seasons and received squad number 9. One day later, the club confirmed that Kelmendi had joined on a permanent transfer.

On 6 September 2017. Kelmendi made his competitive debut for the club in the first leg of 2017–18 Albanian Cup first round, scoring the opener in an 8–0 thrashing of Adriatiku Mamurras. Later, on 29 November 2017. Kelmendi was on the score-sheet again in this competition, where he netted the lone goal of the match against Besëlidhja Lezhë for the second round.

He made his first Albanian Superliga appearance on 22 December by entering in the last minutes of the 3–1 home win over Teuta Durrës.

Loan to Trepça'89
On 20 January 2018, Kelmendi was sent on loan at Football Superleague of Kosovo outfit KF Trepça'89 for the remainder of the season.

KF Llapi
On 17 June 2018, Kelmendi signed for KF Llapi on a 2-year deal.

KF Flamurtari
On 27 December 2018, it was announced that Kelmendi had signed with KF Flamurtari.

Career statistics

References

External links

Shend Kelmendi at the FSHF

1994 births
Living people
Sportspeople from Pristina
Kosovo Albanians
Association football wingers
Kosovan footballers
FC Prishtina players
KF Trepça'89 players
KF Skënderbeu Korçë players
KF Llapi players
KF Flamurtari players
Football Superleague of Kosovo players
Kategoria Superiore players
Kosovan expatriate footballers
Expatriate footballers in Albania
Kosovan expatriate sportspeople in Albania